Vidarbha Vikas Party (Vidarba Development Party), political party in the Indian state of Maharashtra. VVP works for the formation of a separate Vidarbha state in eastern Maharashtra.

Political parties in Maharashtra
Political parties with year of establishment missing